Max Schwabe (December 6, 1905 – July 31, 1983) was a U.S. Representative from Missouri. He was the brother of George Blaine Schwabe.

Schwabe was born in Columbia, Missouri and attended the University of Missouri. Prior to his career in politics, he worked as an insurance agent and a farmer.

Schwabe was elected as a Republican to the Seventy-eighth and the two succeeding Congresses (January 3, 1943 – January 3, 1949). He was an unsuccessful candidate for reelection to the Eighty-first Congress in 1948. He also worked as the Missouri State director of the Farmers Home Administration in the United States Department of Agriculture from 1953 to 1961.

Schwabe died on July 31, 1983, and was interred in Columbia Cemetery.

References

1905 births
1983 deaths
Burials at Columbia Cemetery (Columbia, Missouri)
Politicians from Columbia, Missouri
University of Missouri alumni
Republican Party members of the United States House of Representatives from Missouri
20th-century American politicians